Valerio Alesi (born September 5, 1966) is a former professional soccer player.

Born in Hamilton, Ontario, In 1984, Alesi became the first Canadian-born player to play in the Serie A of the Italian football league system, as a member of Ascoli Calcio. After several seasons with Ascoli, he joined lower division side A.C. Maceratese in the early 1990s.

References

Ascoli Calcio 1898 F.C. players
Canadian expatriate soccer players
Canadian expatriate sportspeople in Italy
Canadian soccer players
Expatriate footballers in Italy
Canadian sportspeople of Italian descent
Soccer players from Hamilton, Ontario
Serie A players
1966 births
Living people
Association football forwards